Spider Glacier is in Wenatchee National Forest in the U.S. state of Washington and is to the east of Phelps Ridge.

This Spider Glacier is not to be confused with another of the same name nearby, Spider Glacier (Spider Mountain, Washington).

See also
List of glaciers in the United States

References

Glaciers of the North Cascades
Glaciers of Chelan County, Washington
Glaciers of Washington (state)